Habib Samaei (Persian: حبیب سماعی, born 1905 – 11 July 1946) was an Iranian musician, Santoor player and music teacher. He has been referred to as the "father of contemporary Iranian santoor playing".

Biography 
Habib Samaei was born in 1905 in Tehran, Qajar Iran. His father, Habib Sama Hozour, was a famous musician of the Qajar period, and his son introduced Habib to music from the age of four. Young Habib Samaei at this time played the Tombak with his father's Santoor, and because of his small size, he placed the instrument on his pillow and accompanied his father. After the age of six, Sama Hozour began teaching his son's Santoor.

In the book History of Iranian Music, Ruhollah Khaleqi writes in a part of his memoir about his first meeting with Sama Hozour and his young son Habib Samaei:

"... Sama Hozour pull a towel on the Santoor, held the mallets and began to play. He had not hit a few more beats when he pointed to his son, to picked up the Tombak and accompanied him. Little Habib hugged Tombak and played softly with his delicate fingers. There was no sound except the beating of the master and the support of the beat… »

At the age of 10, Habib Samaei's santoor's voice was approved and admired by artists such as Nayeb Assadollah and Agha Hosseinghli. He became acquainted with music theory, but did not use what he had learned to record his works, and continued his art in a "breast-to-breast" manner.

Sama Huzar moved to Mashhad with his family late in life, which is why Habib's santorini became famous in Mashhad. He later joined the army because of his interest in the army.

After the death of his father, Habib Samaei returned to Tehran and, with the guidance of his artist friend Abolhassan Saba, inaugurated his santoor class.

Habib Samaei, who was introduced as "Samaei" and was the only student of one of the last Santour musicians (Sama Hozour), was one of the first musicians to play on the radio in 1940 after the opening of the Tehran Transmitter Broadcasting Center. From this time on, the public got to know him and his art. At this time, the officials of the country's music department and Ruhollah Khaleqi, who was the deputy director of the music department, tried to transfer him from the position of an army officer to the Ministry of Culture, with the position of santoor student. Sama'i initially agreed to this and trained students in the country's music department, but due to his interest in officer's uniform, he soon regretted it, returned to the army and was transferred to the Ministry of War.

In 1943, he was one of the artists who joined the National Music Association as a founding member and held concerts with other artists.

Personal life 
Habib Samaei had a romantic relationship with Parvaneh, the singer of that time, and this love influenced his music. Ruhollah Khaleqi mentions the five pages left by Parvaneh and Habib, which are still very influential after seventy years of their lives. "The untimely death of the market butterfly warmed these pages."

Some time later, the untimely death of a young child from his second marriage further aggravated his mental condition. Ruhollah Khaleqi has said in this regard: "His temperament was getting weaker day by day, as he did not have more than a few kilos of skin and bones."

Illness and death 
Habib Samaei contracted pneumonia in February 1945 due to a cold and fell ill. "Samaei does not have a healthy organ in his body and has been hostile to him as much as possible," said one doctor.

Finally, Habib Samaei died on 11 July 1946, at the age of 41, and was buried in Zahir al-Dawla Cemetery.

Artwork 
Habib Samaei was not interested in recording his works. From him, only Gramophone record with the sound of "Parvaneh" are left, the total time of which is less than an hour.

 Gramophone record Mahur and Delkash
 Gramophone record Shur and Shahnaz
 Gramophone record Abu'ata and Hejaz
 Gramophone record Esfahan and Byaterajei
 Gramophone record Zarbiye Shahnaz and Gereyli
 Music album and book "Habib Samaei's beats", containing 20 pieces of Habib Samaei's beats, compiled and played by Majid Kiani.

References 

1905 births
1946 deaths
20th-century Iranian musicians
Iranian santur players
Deaths from pneumonia in Iran
Musicians from Tehran